Korsaren ('The Corsair') was a Norwegian satirical magazine published between 1879 and 1926.

History and profile
Korsaren was established in 1879 by Jacob Breda Bull under the name Krydseren, mimicking an older publication of the same name. Bull sold the magazine in 1894, and it was relaunched as Korsaren. It was published in Kristiania, its editor-in-chief from 1894 to 1903 was Egil Hartmann, and its staff of caricaturists included Andreas Bloch and Gustav Lærum. Korsaren went defunct in 1926.

References

1879 establishments in Norway
1926 disestablishments in Norway
Magazines established in 1879
Magazines disestablished in 1926
Norwegian-language magazines
Defunct magazines published in Norway
Satirical magazines published in Norway
Weekly magazines published in Norway
Magazines published in Oslo